The 1926 Southern Conference men's basketball tournament took place from February 26–March 2, 1926, at Municipal Auditorium in Atlanta, Georgia. The North Carolina Tar Heels won their fourth Southern Conference title, led by head coach Harlan Sanborn. Jack Cobb was Helms Foundation College Basketball Player of the Year.

Bracket

* Overtime game

Championship

All-Southern tournament team

See also
List of Southern Conference men's basketball champions

References

Tournament
Southern Conference men's basketball tournament
Southern Conference men's basketball tournament
Southern Conference men's basketball tournament
Southern Conference men's basketball tournament